Lucas Jiménez was Mayor of Ponce, Puerto Rico, from 4 July 1879 to 30 April 1880. He was a Spanish soldier with the rank of colonel.

See also

 List of Puerto Ricans
 List of mayors of Ponce, Puerto Rico

References

Further reading
 Ramon Marin. Las Fiestas Populares de Ponce. Editorial Universidad de Puerto Rico. 1994.

External links
 Guardia Civil española (c. 1898) (Includes military ranks in 1880s Spanish Empire.)

Mayors of Ponce, Puerto Rico
1820s births
1900s deaths

Year of death uncertain
Year of birth uncertain